Symbatios (from the Armenian Smbat), variously also Sabbatios (Σαββάτιος) or Sambates (Σαμβάτης) in some sources, was the eldest son of the Byzantine emperor Leo V the Armenian. Soon after the coronation of his father, he was crowned co-emperor and renamed Constantine (Κωνσταντῖνος, Kōnstantînos). He reigned nominally along with his father until the latter's deposition in 820, after which he was exiled to Prote, one of the Princes' Islands, as a monk.

Biography
Symbatios was the eldest son of the emperor Leo V the Armenian and his wife, Theodosia. His father was an Armenian commander in Byzantine service, possibly descended from the Gnuni family. He had risen to high command as a protégé of Bardanes Tourkos, but deserted him when the latter rebelled against Nikephoros I. His mother was also of Armenian origin, the daughter of the patrikios Arsaber who attempted an unsuccessful usurpation against Nikephoros I in 808. As he was a child at the time of his father's accession to the throne, Symbatios was born sometime between 800 and 810. Michael I Rhangabes, the son-in-law and successor of Nikephoros I, was likely the boy's godfather.

At the head of a military revolt following the disastrous Battle of Versinikia against the Bulgars, Leo deposed Michael I on 11 July 813 and was crowned emperor on the next day. Some time after he had Symbatios crowned co-emperor and renamed Constantine. The latter name was not chosen randomly: aside from it being a traditional Byzantine imperial name dating back to Constantine the Great, the assembled troops now publicly acclaimed the emperors "Leo and Constantine", evoking openly the iconoclast emperor Leo III the Isaurian and his son Constantine V.

Although prior to his accession Leo had given written guarantees to the iconophile patriarch Nikephoros I that he would not attempt to overthrow iconophile church doctrine, the naming of the new co-emperor was a clear statement of intent to the contrary. Leo's motivations can only be guessed at, but at a time when the environs of Constantinople itself were being raided by the Bulgar ruler Krum, the military successes achieved by the iconoclast emperors contrasted starkly with the defeats suffered by the recent iconophile regimes. Leo was also a military man, and the memory of the iconoclast emperors was particularly cherished by the army, where many still adhered to iconoclasm.

On 14 March 814, Leo forced the resignation of Patriarch Nikephoros I, and appointed the pro-iconoclast Theodotos Melissenos, the son of one of Constantine V's brothers-in-law, in his place. The new patriarch convened a Church council in Constantinople, which overturned the Second Council of Nicaea and reinstated the ban on the veneration of icons. The council was presided over by Theodotos, while Constantine attended it as his father's representative. In 819/820, he issued, jointly with his father, a novel on marriage law.

Leo the Armenian was assassinated on 25 December 820 by the supporters of Michael the Amorian, who had been imprisoned for conspiring against Leo. Michael was released from prison and proclaimed emperor on the same night. The new emperor banished Constantine, along with his mother and three brothers, Basil, Gregory, and Theodosios, to the island of Prote, one of the Princes' Islands in the Sea of Marmara. There, the four brothers were castrated to make them incapable of claiming the throne in the future, and tonsured. They spent the rest of their days there as monks, although Michael the Amorian allowed them to keep part of the proceeds from their confiscated estates for their and their servants' upkeep. Basil and Gregory are still mentioned as iconophiles in 847, but nothing further is known of Constantine.

Notes

References

Sources

 
 
 
 
 
 

800s births
9th-century Byzantine monks
Byzantine people of Armenian descent
Castrated people
9th-century Byzantine emperors
9th-century deaths
Byzantine eunuchs
Byzantine junior emperors
Sons of Byzantine emperors